HTG may refer to:
 Haitian gourde, the currency of Haiti
 Hawaii Territorial Guard, during World War II
 Hugo Treffner Gymnasium, a school in Tartu, Estonia
 Human Thyroglobulin, a protein produced by the thyroid gland
 Hunting plc, a British energy company
 Khatanga Airport, in Krasnoyarsk Krai, Russia